In economics, the wage ratio refers to the ratio of the top salaries in a group (company, city, country, etc.) to the bottom salaries.  It is a measure of wage dispersion.

There has been a resurgence in the importance of the wage ratio. The amount of money paid out to executives has steadily been on the rise. In the US "an April 2013 study by Bloomberg finds that large public company CEOs were paid an average of 204 times the compensation of rank-and-file workers in their industries.  By comparison, it is estimated that the average CEO was paid about 20 times the typical worker’s pay in the 1950s, with that multiple rising to 42-to-1 in 1980, and to 120-to-1 in 2000". While not as extreme, similar trends have been observed around the world.

Regulation, Reporting and Initiatives
With wage ratios steadily climbing, there has been a push to have increased transparency in publicizing the ratio for many of the world's largest companies. There have also been a number of movements around to the world to attempt to regulate the pay ratio between executives and workers, or to regulate executive pay from the workers' end. Notably, an excessive wage ratio may not be in the best interest of company as it harms customer satisfaction and does not benefit long-term firm performance. Nevertheless, as high wage ratios boost short-term firm profitability, there may be a need for regulation.

Canada: The Wagemark Foundation, a Toronto-based not-for-profit organization is working to create an international wage standard certifying organizations that can prove they operate with a wage ratio of 2.0 or lower per day.

Germany: Companies in Germany with over 2000 employees are required to have a supervisory board, half of which are required to be workers of said company, under the Mitbestimmungsgesetz, enforcing codetermination. The supervisory board sets the executive wages of the company.

Spain: In 2013, the Spanish Socialist Workers Party, the official Spanish opposition party, adopted a ratio as part of their official policy. The Mondragon Corporation, a worker-owned cooperative headquartered in the Basque Country, has an internal wage ratio at an average of 5:1, periodically decided with a democratic vote.

Switzerland:  was a Swiss referendum held on November 24, 2013 in an attempt to create legislation limiting the amount of executive pay to a maximum of 12 times that of the lowest paid workers. The referendum was rejected by 65.3%, with a turnout of 53%, and no canton took on the initiative. The largest rejection came from the canton of Zug, accepted by only 23% of the votes, and the least rejection came from Ticino, where it was supported by 49%.

United Kingdom: In 2017, the Leader of the Opposition Jeremy Corbyn called for an enforced wage ratio for any company awarded a government contract, of 20:1 between the executives and the lowest-paid employee. A similar call was previously made by Prime Minister David Cameron in 2010 for the public sector.

United States: In 2010 President Barack Obama signed into effect the Dodd–Frank Wall Street Reform and Consumer Protection Act. In short, Section 953(b) of the Dodd-Frank Act changed the regulation regarding CEO compensation disclosure to shareholders. In December 2016, the city of Portland, Oregon voted to implement a surcharge for chief executives who earn more than 100 times the median pay of their workers in 2017.

Pay ratio
United States:  The Dodd–Frank Wall Street Reform and Consumer Protection Act requires publicly traded companies to report of a "pay ratio" which is the ratio between the CEO and the median employee, which began in 2018.  For example, McDonald's has a pay ratio of $5.3 per day

See also
 Maximum wage
 Family wage
 Basic income

References

Ratio
Labour economics indices